Université Mundiapolis is a private university in Casablanca, Morocco.

The university, a merger of the Institut du Management et du Droit de l'Entreprise (IMADE), Ecole Marocaine d'Informatique, Electronique et Automatique (EMIAE), and Polyfinance; was established in 2009 as Morocco's full private university.

References

External links
  Université Mundiapolis

Universities in Morocco
Education in Casablanca
Organizations based in Casablanca
Buildings and structures in Casablanca
2009 establishments in Morocco
Educational institutions established in 2009
21st-century architecture in Morocco